Jürgen Schornagel (born 1939) is a German actor. He has appeared in more than one hundred films since 1966.

Selected filmography

References

External links 

1939 births
Living people
German male film actors